David William Duchovny (born ) is an American actor, writer, producer, director, and singer-songwriter. He is known for portraying FBI agent Fox Mulder on the television series The X-Files (1993–2002, 2016-2018) and as writer Hank Moody on the television series Californication (2007–2014), both of which have earned him Golden Globe awards. Duchovny appeared in both X-Files films, the 1998 science fiction-thriller of the same name and the supernatural-thriller The X-Files: I Want to Believe (2008). He executive-produced and starred in the historically based cop drama Aquarius (2015–2016). 

His film work includes minor roles in the coming-of-age black comedy Don't Tell Mom the Babysitter's Dead (1991), and the family comedy Beethoven (1992). Also in 1992, he played Roland Totheroh in the biographical comedy-drama Chaplin with Robert Downey Jr. In the 2000's, he starred in Return to Me with Minnie Driver (2000), Evolution with Seann William Scott (2001), Connie and Carla with Nia Vardalos (2004), House of D with Robin Williams (2004), and The Joneses with Demi Moore (2009).

Duchovny holds a B.A. in English literature from Princeton University, and a M.A. in English literature from Yale University, and has since published five books: Holy Cow: A Modern-Day Dairy Tale (2015), Bucky F*cking Dent (2016), Miss Subways (2018), Truly Like Lightning (2021), and The Reservoir (2022).

Early life

Duchovny was born in New York City in 1960. He is the son of Amram "Ami" Ducovny (1927–2003), a writer and publicist who worked for the American Jewish Committee, and his wife Margaret "Meg" (née Miller), a school administrator and teacher. He is the second son and the middle child of three children. He has an elder brother, Daniel (born 1956) and a younger sister, Laurie (born 1966). Duchovny's mother is a Scottish immigrant from Aberdeen, Scotland. His father was Jewish, and his mother was Lutheran. His father dropped the h in his last name to avoid the sort of mispronunciations he encountered while serving in the Army. In the Polish language, duchowny means 'clergyman', and in the Ukrainian language it means 'spiritual'. Duchovny's paternal grandfather was a Jewish emigrant from Berdychiv, Ukraine, and Duchovny's paternal grandmother was a Jewish emigrant from Congress Poland (now in Poland). 
 
Duchovny attended The Collegiate School For Boys in Manhattan (where he was a classmate of John F. Kennedy Jr.) from which he graduated as head boy in 1978. He then attended Princeton University where he graduated Phi Beta Kappa and summa cum laude in 1982 with an A.B. in English literature. He was a member of Charter Club, one of the university's eating clubs. In 1982, his poetry received an honorable mention for a college prize from the Academy of American Poets. The title of his senior thesis was The Schizophrenic Critique of Pure Reason in Beckett's Early Novels. He played junior varsity basketball at Princeton. He earned a Master of Arts in English Literature from Yale University and subsequently began work on a Ph.D. that remains unfinished. The title of his uncompleted doctoral thesis is Magic and Technology in Contemporary Fiction and Poetry.

Roots
His great-great-grandfather and his family moved from Berdychiv (then in the Russian Empire, now in Ukraine) to Jaffa (then in the Ottoman Empire, now in Israel). In December 1914 his ancestors were among 6,000 Jews who were forcibly removed from their homes by Ottoman police, violently expelled from Jaffa, and deported by ship to Egypt.

Career
Duchovny appeared in an advertisement for Löwenbräu beer in 1987. The next year he appeared in Working Girl (1988). He had a small recurring role as Denise Bryson, a transgender DEA agent on the series Twin Peaks and played the narrator and host in the Showtime softcore erotica TV series Red Shoe Diaries. In 1992, he played the role of Rollie Totheroh in the biographic film Chaplin, directed by Richard Attenborough and based on the life of Charlie Chaplin. In 1992 he had a small role in the family film Beethoven.

In 1993, Duchovny began starring in the science fiction series The X-Files, as FBI Special Agent Fox Mulder, a conspiracy theorist who believed his sister had been abducted by aliens. The show evolved into a cult hit and became one of The Fox Network's first major television hits. According to The X-Files creator Chris Carter, Duchovny turned out to be one of the best-read people he knew. After getting the role, Duchovny thought the show would not last for long or make as much impact as it did. Executive producer Frank Spotnitz called Duchovny "amazingly smart". Spotnitz further stated that Duchovny was behind some of the main characteristic ideas behind Mulder. Also in 1993, Duchovny was cast alongside Brad Pitt and Juliette Lewis, in the Dominic Sena-directed thriller Kalifornia.

During The X-Files run, in between the fifth and sixth seasons, Duchovny co-starred alongside Gillian Anderson in a 1998 film also titled The X-Files that continued the storyline. He remained with the series until leaving the show in 2001, partly because of a contract dispute that occurred after season seven finished filming. Duchovny appeared in half of the season eight episodes, but did not appear in season nine until the series finale in 2002. He also provided the voice for a parody of his Mulder character in the episode "The Springfield Files" of the animated comedy series The Simpsons. Duchovny has been nominated for four Emmy Awards.

Duchovny caused controversy when it became public that he was the primary reason for The X-Files moving filming locations from Vancouver, British Columbia to Los Angeles in 1998. Many residents of Vancouver were upset with Duchovny over scripted jokes on Late Night with Conan O'Brien about the city's heavy rainfall, including one where he joked, "Vancouver is a very nice place if you like 400 inches of rainfall a day." (Duchovny's character Mulder would later reference this joke in the Season 5 episode "Schizogeny.") He also stated, "Of course, I'm tired of the rain. But if I wasn't married to a woman that lives in L.A., I'd stay in Vancouver. It's a lovely city." During the run of The X-Files, he also made several guest appearances in the cult TV satire The Larry Sanders Show, playing a fictionalized version of himself who is very attracted to Sanders. In the final episode of the series, he performed a parody of Sharon Stone's 'flashing' scene from Basic Instinct and a parody of Dr. Hannibal Lecter being introduced to Agent Clarice Starling in The Silence of the Lambs.

Duchovny has guest-hosted Saturday Night Live twice (May 13, 1995, and May 9, 1998). Both shows were season finales. In 2000 he starred in the feature film Return to Me, a romantic comedy/drama directed by Bonnie Hunt and co-starring Minnie Driver and Carroll O'Connor. In 2001, Duchovny starred as Ira Kane in the sci-fi comedy film Evolution, alongside Seann William Scott, and had a cameo as hand model J.P. Prewitt in the Ben Stiller comedy Zoolander. He appeared in a celebrity edition of Who Wants to Be a Millionaire? in May 2000. He got to the $250,000 question but answered his $500,000 question incorrectly and lost $218,000, leaving him with $32,000. He appeared on Celebrity Jeopardy! in 1995 and 2010.

Duchovny provided the voice of Ethan Cole in the 2005 video game Area 51, as well as that of the title character in the 2003 video game XIII. In 2003 Duchovny starred in the 84th episode of the HBO show Sex and the City. He played the role of Jeremy, Carrie Bradshaw's high-school ex-boyfriend, who has committed himself to a Connecticut mental health facility. In 2005, Duchovny provided the voice-over for a PSA radio campaign for Act Against Violence. In 2005, Duchovny, who had already made his directorial debut with an episode of The X-Files, wrote, directed, and appeared in the feature film House of D. The film starred Anton Yelchin, Robin Williams, and Duchovny's then-wife Téa Leoni in a coming-of-age tale. It received mostly poor reviews and little box office success. Duchovny also directed "Judas on a Pole," an episode of Bones, during the show's second season.

From 2007 to 2014, Duchovny played the troubled, womanizing novelist, Hank Moody, in the Showtime series, Californication. The portrayal landed him a Golden Globe Award for Best Actor in a Television Comedy or Musical in 2007. In March 2014, NBC announced that a new TV series, entitled Aquarius, would be produced starring Duchovny. Duchovny portrayed a 1960s police sergeant investigating small-time criminal and budding cult leader Charles Manson. In March 2015, Duchovny was announced as returning in a six-episode continuation of The X-Files. It premiered on January 24, 2016, on Fox.

In 2017, he decided to put his acting career on hold so he could focus on his career as a novelist and singer/songwriter. Duchovny's then last acting job was in the 11th season of The X-Files in 2018. He made his return to acting in The Craft: Legacy, the 2020 film sequel to The Craft.

Personal life
Duchovny married actress Téa Leoni on May 13, 1997. They have two children, a daughter born in April 1999 and a son born in June 2002.

In 2008, the couple separated; Duchovny received treatment for sex addiction from August to October. Claims by the Daily Mail that he had an affair with Hungarian tennis instructor Edit Pakay led to legal threats and a retraction by the paper on November 15. In 2009, Duchovny and Leoni reunited but separated again on June 29, 2011. Duchovny filed for divorce in June 2014, and the couple had agreed to settlement terms by that August.

Duchovny is a vegetarian or pescetarian and is supportive of environmentalism, and an enthusiast of electric vehicle technology. He made an appearance at the 2011 Tribeca Film Festival in support of the film Revenge of the Electric Car.

Acting credits

Film

Television

Video games

Audiobooks
 2015: Audiobook To Legend He Goes: A Tale from The Legend of Drizzt
 2017: Audiobook X-Files - cold cases - an Audible original
 2017: Audiobook X files - stolen lives - an Audible original

Discography and tours

Studio albums

Tours
 The Hell or Highwater Tour (2015–2016)
 Every Third Thought Tour (2018–2019)

Works
 2011: Introduction to: Coach: 25 Writers Reflect on People Who Made a Difference .
 2015: Holy Cow: A Modern-Day Dairy Tale, Farrar, Straus and Giroux .
 2016: Bucky F*cking Dent, Farrar, Straus and Giroux .
 2018: Miss Subways: A Novel, Farrar, Straus and Giroux .
 2021: Truly Like Lightning: A Novel, Farrar, Straus and Giroux .
 2022: The Reservoir: A Novella, Akashic Books .

References

External links

The Washington Post Interview with David Duchovny, April 2007 David Duchovny and the Drama of Television

1960 births
20th-century American male actors
21st-century American male actors
American male film actors
American male television actors
American people of Polish-Jewish descent
American people of Scottish descent
American people of Russian-Jewish descent
American people of Ukrainian-Jewish descent
American television directors
Television producers from New York City
Alternative rock guitarists
Alternative rock singers
Best Drama Actor Golden Globe (television) winners
Best Musical or Comedy Actor Golden Globe (television) winners
Collegiate School (New York) alumni
Film directors from New York City
American indie rock musicians
Living people
Male actors from New York City
People from Fire Island, New York
People from the Upper East Side
Princeton University alumni
Yale Graduate School of Arts and Sciences alumni
People from the Upper West Side
Jewish singers